Sol da Liberdade (Portuguese for Sun of freedom) is the fifth studio album by Daniela Mercury, released in April 2000 in Brazil through BMG. Two of its singles, "Ilê Pérola Negra" and "Como Vai Você", became number-one hits in Brazil. The other single released from the album, "Santa Helena", peaked at number twenty-six.

Background
On the cover of Sol da Liberdade, photographed by Mario Cravo Neto and created by Gringo Cardia, the singer wields a dry branch that suggests a sword, but her peaceful look eliminates an intention of war. "There I represented a black Iansã that freed Brazil from slavery in commemoration of the 500th anniversary of the country." said Mercury.

Two songs present in Sol da Liberdade made huge success in Brazilian radios. The first was "Ilê Pérola Negra", a song that actually the joining of two different compositions: "O Canto do Negro" (The Song of the Negro) written by Miltão and "Pérola Negra" (Black Pearl) written by Guiguio and Rene Poison. The music video of this song won the VMB award for Best Axé Video. The other song that reached enormous popularity on the radio was "Como Vai Você?", a song written by the brothers Antonio and Mario Marcos, who was part of the soundtrack of the telenovela "Laços de Família" (Family Ties). Other songs on the album, such as "Santa Helena" and "Só No Balanço do Mar" - the latter included in the soundtrack of another telenovela "Porto dos Milagres" (Port of Miracles) - won a success somewhat moderate.

The album-selling in Brazil was higher than 800,000 copies, which is the fourth biggest selling album of Mercury in the country. It was also released a re-edition of the album produced especially for the countries of Latin America. This re-edition, produced by the famous Emilio Estefan Jr., contained some tracks sung in Spanish.

Track listing

Chart performance

Certifications

References

2000 albums
Daniela Mercury albums